Peter Anderson is a cinematographer, visual effects supervisor, and leading expert on a number of specialized imaging technologies, many of which he helped to develop, including modern 3-D, motion control, large format, high frame rate, and high dynamic range.

Anderson was the staff director of photography at Walt Disney Animation Studios, and he has led visual-effects facilities at Walt Disney Studios and Universal Studios.

Anderson was instrumental in the creation of the theme-park attractions King Kong: 360 3-D, T2 3-D: Battle Across Time and Captain Eo. Peter has also supervised IMAX 3-D productions, including Cirque du Soleil: Journey of Man  and Wild Ocean, and contributed visual effects to an array of projects, including the features U2 3D and Tron and the original incarnations of the television series Battlestar Galactica and Cosmos.

In 2014, Anderson received the Academy of Motion Picture Arts and Sciences prestigious Gordon E. Sawyer Award, a special Oscar awarded to "an individual in the motion picture industry whose technological contributions have brought credit to the industry."

References

External links
 

Year of birth missing (living people)
Living people
American cinematographers
Recipients of the Gordon E. Sawyer Award